Nadia Hordijenko Andrianova (Надія Миколаївна Андріанова-Гордієнко in Ukrainian; 1921–1998) was a Ukrainian writer and translator of the language Esperanto. She studied literature and journalism in Kyiv and published articles and translations in Paco and Hungara Vivo. In 1987, the Hungarian Esperanto Association published her autobiography Vagante tra la mondo maltrankvila. She also wrote about Vasili Eroshenko.

Publications
Monumentoj de l'eterna amikeco;  Renkonto kun Baba Parasxkeva;  Disigxo kun Rodopoj;  Glorkanto al Jambol; Glorkanto al Esperanto (En: Bukedo, p. 64 - 74)
Vagante tra la mondo maltrankvila (Budapest: Hungara Esperanto-Asocio, 1987. - 102 p. - )

Translations
Ukrainaj popolaj fabeloj (Sofia: BEA, 1983. - 76 p.)
Ukrainka, Lesja: Liriko (Kyiv: Komisiono pri Internaciaj Ligoj de Ukrainiaj Esperantistoj, 1971. - 86 p. : ilustr.)

Ukrainian writers
Ukrainian women writers
Translators to Esperanto
Writers of Esperanto literature
1921 births
1998 deaths
Ukrainian Esperantists
20th-century women writers
20th-century translators
Soviet writers